Kjell Granqvist is a retired Swedish footballer. Granqvist made 15 Allsvenskan appearances for Djurgården and scored 0 goals.

References

Swedish footballers
Djurgårdens IF Fotboll players
Hammarby Fotboll players
Association footballers not categorized by position
Year of birth missing